The Gaylords were an American singing trio, consisting of Ronald L. Fredianelli (June 12, 1930 – January 25, 2004), Bonaldo "Burt" Bonaldi (July 6, 1926 – May 10, 2017), and Don Rea (December 9, 1928 – June 30, 2017). Fredianelli joined the U. S. Army in the 1950s, and was replaced by Bill Christ.

Fredianelli and Rea were born in Detroit, Michigan. Together with Bonaldi, they formed the Gaylords (originally The Gay Lords) in Detroit in 1949. The group's name was decided upon after a chance encounter with Marcus Wren.

In the 1950s the group had a number of Italian-flavored hits on the Mercury Records label, often consisting of a song partly sung in Italian and partly in English. Their most successful release was "Tell Me You're Mine", which had sold over one million copies by 1958.  "Tell Me You're Mine" reached #3 on the US chart. They also recorded comedy-novelty material, like "Love I You."

Fredianelli rejoined Mercury in 1954 after his military service, and, as Ronnie Gaylord, recorded as a solo artist (charting with his hit song "Cuddle Me"). Bonaldi, Rea, and Christ continued recording as The Gaylords for Mercury until 1964. After their recording contract lapsed, Rea and Christ left the group. Fredianelli and Bonaldi continued to perform as "Gaylord and Holiday"; Bonaldi used the professional name of Burt Holiday, and adopted it legally in 1976. The team stayed together until 2003, when Fredianelli's failing health curtailed further work.

Fredianelli died on January 25, 2004, in Reno, Nevada, at age 73.

Bonaldi still performed with Ron Gaylord, Jr., Ronnie Gaylord's oldest son (the other son being rock guitarist Tony Fredianelli) until his death on May 10, 2017, in Carson City, Nevada, at age 90.

Donald "Don" Rea, keyboardist for The Gaylords, died in Reno, Nevada, on June 30, 2017, after a short battle with cancer, at age 88.

Hit records

References

External links
Interview with Original Member, Burt Holiday, August 2012
Official website
The Interlude Era page

American vocal groups
Mercury Records artists
Italian-American culture
Musical groups from Detroit
Musical groups established in 1949
Musical groups disestablished in 2003
1949 establishments in Michigan
2003 disestablishments in the United States